Long Sutton Athletic F.C. is an English football club from Long Sutton, Lincolnshire.

History
The club was established in 1983, although Long Sutton Town had played in the Peterborough & District League between 1932 and 1953. The new club joined Division Six of the Peterborough & District League in 1984, and won the division at the first attempt. The following season they won Division Five, going undefeated in the league. In 1986–87 they won Division Four and applied to join the United Counties League, but withdrew their application after it became obvious that a new stand could not be built in time. However, the following season they won Division Three and were then accepted into Division One of the Eastern Counties League as the league added a second division. Despite the huge step up, they finished seventh in their first season. However, by the mid-1990s the club was struggling with the costs of playing in the ECL and resigned in order to return to the Peterborough & District League. They replaced their reserve team in Division Five for the 1995–96 season, winning all 20 matches. They went on to win Division Four, Division Three and Division Two titles in successive seasons, earning promotion straight to the Premier Division in 1999.

In 2005–06 they finished bottom of the Premier Division, but avoided relegation as one promoted club withdrew from the league and the other chose not to take promotion. However, they finished bottom again the following season and were relegated to Division One.

Honours
Peterborough & District League
Division Two champions 1998–99
Division Three champions 1987–88, 1997–98
Division Four champions 1986–87, 1996–97
Division Five champions 1985–86, 1995–96
Division Six champions 1984–85
Lincolnshire Junior Cup
Winners 1985–86
Lincolnshire Senior 'B' Cup
Winners 1989–90
Peterborough Minor Cup
Winners 1984–85
Peterborough Challenge Cup
Winners 1996–97, 1997–98
Peterborough Junior Cup
Winners 1998–99

Records
FA Vase
Second Qualifying Round 1995–96

See also
Long Sutton Athletic F.C. players
Long Sutton Athletic F.C. managers

References

External links
Club website

Long Sutton Athletic FC Pyramid Passion

 
Football clubs in England
Association football clubs established in 1983
Football clubs in Lincolnshire
1983 establishments in England
Peterborough and District Football League
United Counties League
Eastern Counties Football League
Long Sutton, Lincolnshire